Canadian Girls in Training, or CGIT, is a church-based program for girls and young women aged 11–17 throughout Canada. Girls who join the CGIT vow to "Cherish Health, Seek Truth, Know God, Serve Others and thus, with [Jesus'] help, become the girl God would have me be".

History

The group was founded in 1915, as an alternative to the burgeoning Girl Guides movement, which the founders felt was too British or American and too authoritarian. Initial support was provided by the YWCA, along with the Anglican, Baptist, Presbyterian, and Methodist churches. A uniform to be worn by the members, consisting of a white and blue middy blouse, was modelled on a style of shirt that was popular at that time.

By the end of its first decade, 75,000 girls had received CGIT training. By 1933, there were chapters in 1100 communities across the country, with a total membership of 40,000. Later, after the YWCA ran into financial difficulties, the group was taken over by the Canadian Council of Churches' Department of Christian Education, and was an independent organization by 1976. Today, it is supported by the United Church of Canada, the Presbyterian Church in Canada, and the Canadian Baptist Ministries, and numbers approximately 2,000 members in 150 groups.

Activities

CGIT leaders organize a variety of creative and athletic activities rooted in or consistent with contemporary Christian (Protestant) values. CGIT members also have the option of attending one of several CGIT camps, including Kalalla (Alcove, Quebec), Ryde Lake (Gravenhurst, Ontario), and Wohelo (near Edmonton, Alberta). The camps provide opportunities for healthy outdoor fun and group activities.

Archives 
There is a Canadian Girls in Training fonds at Library and Archives Canada. The archival reference number is R2975, former archival reference number MG28-I313. The fond covers the date range 1913 to 1985. It consists of 3.83 meters of textual records, 806 photographs and a number of other media records.

References

  City of Toronto Archives Site accessed February 3, 2008
 Keller, Rosemary Skinner, Ruether, Rosemary Radford, Carlton, Marie. "The Encyclopedia of Women and Religion in North America". pp. 365–366. Indiana University Press. 2006.
 McIntosh, Robert Gordon. "Boys in the Pits: Child Labour in Coal Mines". p. 19. McGill-Queen's University Press. 2000.
 McLean, Lorna R., O'Rourke, Kate. "Framing Our Past: Canadian Women's History in the Twentieth Century". pp. 155–156. McGill-Queen's University Press. 2001.

External links
Canadian Girls in Training website
Camp Kalalla website
Ryde Lake Camp website
C.G.I.T. Camp Wohelo website

Christian organizations established in 1915
Christian education in Canada